Sword of Saros is an action-adventure game for the Atari 2600 equipped with the Starpath Supercharger peripheral. The game was only sold via mail order by Starpath and few copies were made. It was programmed by Jon Leupp and Stephen Landrum.

Gameplay
The objective is to explore the evil wizard's maze-like dungeon to find the pieces of the Sword of Saros. The wizard sends bats to find the player; when successful, the wizard teleports to the player's location and sends waves of skeletons to attack. Helpful magical items can be found in the world.

References

External links
 Sword of Saros at Atari Mania

1983 video games
Action-adventure games
Atari 2600 games
Atari 2600-only games
Starpath games
Video games developed in the United States